Røvær is an island group in Haugesund Municipality in Rogaland county, Norway.

There is regular express boat service between Røvær, the neighboring island of Feøy, and the town of Haugesund.  Most island residents also own a private boat and have a car parked in Haugesund that they use on the mainland.  The ferry boats have capacity to take one car on board; a direct route between Røvær and Haugesund takes 25 minutes each way.

The  Røvær islands have about one hundred permanent residents (2014), as well as seasonal residents and visitors who rent vacation homes, stay at Røvær Seahouse (Røvær Sjøhus) or the newer Røvær Culture Hotel (Røvær Kulturhotell).  The permanent residents who are not retired support themselves principally through farming, fishing, employment at the express boat service, teaching at the island's local school, working at the salmon fish farm, or by commuting to work on the mainland.  

During World War II, the island was occupied by German military forces, and there is still a concrete pillbox on Varden, the island's highest point.

Media gallery

See also
List of islands of Norway

References

Islands of Rogaland
Haugesund